This is a list of prominent Mauritians.

Political figures 
 Seewoosagur Ramgoolam (1900–1985), first Prime Minister and former Governor-General 
 Navin Ramgoolam (1947–), ex-Prime Minister, leader of the Labour Party (Mauritius)
 Shakeel Mohamed, Former Minister of Labour, Industrial Relations and Employment. (2010-2014)
 Rama Sithanen (1954–), former Vice Prime Minister
 Paul Raymond Bérenger (1945–), former Prime Minister (2003–2005)
 Raman Osman, former Governors-General
 Charles Gaetan Xavier-Luc Duval (1958–), Vice Prime Minister, leader of PMSD
 Roshi Bhadain, former Minister of Financial Services, Good Governance and Institutional Reforms
 Anil Bachoo, former Minister of Public Infrastructure of Mauritius
 Arvin Boolell, leader of opposition, former Minister 
 Harish Boodhoo, former Deputy Prime Minister 
 Abdool Razack Mohamed (1906–1978), one of the three founding fathers of independent Mauritius
 Anerood Jugnauth, former Prime Minister
 Angidi Chettiar (1928–2010), former Vice President
 Cassam Moollan, Chief Justice and acting Governor General (1985–1986)
 Cassam Uteem (1941–), former President
 Dayendranath Burrenchobay, former Governor General
 Emmanuel Anquetil, politician
 Jaya Krishna Cuttaree, diplomat, former minister
 Karl Offmann (1940–), former President
 Louis Joseph Coralie (1912–1967), politician
 Madun Dulloo, diplomat, former minister
 Monique Ohsan Bellepeau, Vice President
 Paul Raymond Bérenger (1945–), former Prime Minister (2003–2005)
 Rabindranath Ghurburrun (1928–2008), former Vice President
 Raouf Bundhun (1937–), former Vice President
 Rashid Beebeejaun (1935–), former Deputy Prime Minister
 Sangeet Fowdar (1957–), Government MP and former Minister of Training, Skills Development, Productivity and External Communications
 Serge Clair (1940–), former leader of Rodrigues
 Sheila Bappoo, Government Minister
 Sookdeo Bissoondoyal (1908–1977), politician and one of the three founding fathers of independent Mauritius
 Veerasamy Ringadoo (1920–2000), first President
 Pravind Jugnauth (1961–), Prime Minister and former Vice Prime Minister, leader of the MSM
 Ariranga Pillay, former chief justice
 Emilienne Rochecouste, first female elected member of Legislative Council 
 Kher Jagatsingh, former minister of planning and education 
 Satcam Boolell, former deputy Prime Minister and High Commissioner in London 
 Prithvirajsing Roopun (1959–), President
 Pramila Patten (1958–), Under-Secretary-General of the United Nations

Scientists and technologists 
 Jean Marie Bosser (1922–2013), botanist
 Charles-Édouard Brown-Séquard (1817–1894), neurologist, physiologist
 France Staub (1920–2005), ornithologist and conservationist
 Joël de Rosnay (1937–), futurist, molecular biologist
 Julien François Desjardins (1799–1840), zoologist
 Joseph Désiré Tholozan (1820–1897), epidemiologist

Philanthropists and social activists 
 Shirin Ameeruddy-Cziffra, human rights activist

Religious figures 
 Pandit Basdeo Bissoondoyal
 Jacques-Désiré Laval 
 Mother Superior Caroline Lenferna de Laresle (1824–1900)
 Cardinal Jean Margéot (1916–2009), Catholic clergyman
 Cardinal Maurice Piat

Writers

Poets 
 Edouard Maunick
 Joseph Tsang Mang Kin

TV and Radio
 Yanish Engutsamy, Radio Jockey, Presenter

Entertainment

Film Directors 
 David Constantin
 Vincent Toi

Comedians
 Miselaine Duval, comedian, television producer and writer
 Vince Duvergé
 Angry Anderson
 DJ Assad

Singers 

 Kaya
 Menwar
 Havana Brown (born Angelique Meunier; 14 February 1985), Mauritian Australian DJ, recording artist and dancer.
 Mélanie René

Models-Miss Mauritius 

 Ameeksha Dilchand
 Diya Beeltah
 Laetitia Darche
 Nathalie Lesage
 Viveka Babajee
 Pallavi Gungaram
 Urvashi Gooriah
 Bessika Bucktawor
 Hazel Keech, British−Mauritian model

Choreographer 
 Jocelyn Alizart, ballet teacher and choreographer
 Sanedhip Bhimjee

Actresses 
 Viveka Babajee (1973–2010), model and actress
 Françoise Pascal, actress, singer, dancer, fashion model, and producer
 Hazel Keech, British−Mauritian model

Fashion Designer 
 Yuvna Kim, fashion designer (Mauritian-born, London-based fashion designer, model, and TV entertainment journalist)

Sports 
 Benoit Bouchet, first windsurfer to sail between Mauritius and Réunion Island unassisted.
 Ranini Cundasawmy, first female to win the gold medal at a Muay Thai World Championship. The championship was held in March 2017 in Bangkok, Thailand.
 Annabelle Lascar, participated in the 2008 and 2012 Summer Olympics
 Corinne Leclair, swimmer who participated in the 1992 Summer Olympics.
 Veronique Marrier D'Unienville archery, participated in the 2008 Summer Olympics
 Jonathan Bru, French-born professional footballer who plays for Portuguese club U.D. Oliveirense and the Mauritius national team.
 Kévin Bru, French-born professional footballer who plays for English Championship side Ipswich Town and the Mauritius national team.
 Stéphan Buckland, retired track and field athlete who competed in the 100m and 200m.
 Richarno Colin, boxer best known for winning the Light Welterweight gold medal at the 2011 All-Africa Games.
 Vikash Dhorasoo, French-born former footballer who played at both professional and international levels as a midfielder.
 Bruno Julie, bantamweight boxer who won a number of medals in international tournaments and competed in the 2008 Olympics.
 Eric Milazar, national athletics record holder in the 400m, the 300m, the 200m indoor and the 400m indoor.
 Pascal Wehrlein, German-born Formula One driver currently driving for Sauber, driver for Manor in 2016 and Mercedes F1 Team protégé. In 2014, Wehrlein became the youngest driver to win a DTM race at the age of 19 and the youngest to win the title in 2015 at the age of 21 with the Mercedes-Benz team HWA AG.
 Ned Charles, Mauritian-born (Mahebourg) former footballer who played at both professional and international levels as an attacker. First Mauritian to play professionally in Europe.
 Tommy Fury, British-born Professional Boxer, reality television contestant.
 Sylvain Content, retired footballer who played for the national team
 Steeve Curpanen, retired footballer who played for the national team
 Shanawaz Allyboccus, retired footballer who played for the national team

See also

References